William Steere was an Irish Anglican priest in the seventeenth century.

He was Dean of Ardfert from 1620 to 1628 when he became Bishop of Ardfert and Aghadoe.  In 1636 he was presented In commendam with the Archdeaconries of Cork and Cloyne. He died in office on 21 January 1638.

References

Deans of Ardfert
Bishops of Ardfert and Aghadoe
1638 deaths
Year of birth unknown
Archdeacons of Cloyne
Archdeacons of Cork